Swanenburg is a Dutch surname. Notable people with the surname include:

Claes Isaacsz Swanenburg (1572–1652), Dutch painter
Isaac van Swanenburg (1537–1614), Dutch painter and glazier
Jacob van Swanenburgh (1571–1638), Dutch painter
Maria Swanenburg (1839–1915), Dutch serial killer

Dutch-language surnames